Johnson Toribiong (born 22 July 1946) is a Palauan attorney and politician.  
Toribiong became the President of Palau, following his victory in the November 2008 election,
and left office in 2013. Before 2020 elections, Toribiong has run for president four times - in 1992, 1996, 2008 and 2012.

Background and early career
Toribiong was born in Airai, one of the states of Palau. He attended the College of Guam, 1965–66, and holds a Juris Doctor degree (1972) and a Master of Laws (1973) degree from the University of Washington School of Law. His LL.M. thesis was entitled, "Oil Pollution by Ships and Micronesia: A Survey of Maritime Jurisdiction and Applicable Laws."

He ran for president in the 1992 elections; he attracted 3,188 votes, versus 2,084 for one-term incumbent Ngiratkel Etpison and 3,125 for rival Kuniwo Nakamura; however, as no candidate attracted more than 50% of the vote, Nakamura and Toribiong went on to a runoff election, in which Toribiong was defeated.

President
Toribiong was a candidate for President of Palau during the November 2008 presidential election. His running mate for Vice President was Kerai Mariur, a Delegate in the Palau National Congress.  Toribiong was opposed by Elias Camsek Chin, the outgoing Palauan Vice President.

Toribiong led the early, unofficial vote tally with 1,629 votes to Chin's 1,499. The lead ultimately held and Toribiong defeated Chin in the election.

Toribiong was sworn into office as President of Palau on January 15, 2009.

He was defeated in the Presidential election of 2012. One of the issues was his acceptance of 6 Uyghur former prisoners at Guantanamo Bay, Cuba who didn't fit into Palauan society.

References

1946 births
Ambassadors of Palau to Taiwan
Living people
Palauan lawyers
People from Airai
Presidents of Palau
University of Washington School of Law alumni